Dniester Estuary, or Dniester Liman is a liman, formed at the point where the river Dniester flows into the Black Sea. It is located in Ukraine, in Odessa Oblast, and connects Budjak to the Ukrainian mainland. The city of Bilhorod-Dnistrovskyi lies on its western shore and Ovidiopol on its eastern shore. Shabo, situated downstream of Bilhorod-Dnistrovskyi, is known for its wine. The estuary hosts the Bilhorod-Dnistrovsky Seaport.

The area of the liman varies between 360 and 408 km2, it is 42.5 km long and has maximum width of 12 km.  The average depth is 1.8 m, the maximum depth 2.7 m.

On the spit separating the liman from the open Black Sea to the south is the resort town of Zatoka. The only entirely Ukrainian road connecting to Budjak is the H33 along the spit; to avoid the marshes at the northern end of the liman, Highway M15 has to cross into Moldova.

2022 Russian invasion of Ukraine 
On 2 May 2022, during the invasion, a Russian rocket strike hit Zatoka Bridge, a strategically important bridge over the estuary.

See also
 Berezan Estuary
 Tylihul Estuary
 Small Adzhalyk Estuary
 Khadzhibey Estuary
 Sukhyi Estuary

References

External links

 Datasheet from www.wetlands.org (pdf file)
  1:100,000 topographic map of the liman - northern section
  1:100,000 topographic map of the liman - southern section

Estuaries of Ukraine
Estuaries of the Black Sea
Ramsar sites in Ukraine
Landforms of Odesa Oblast
Dniester